Golovchino is a rural locality (a selo) in Grayvoronsky District of Belgorod Oblast, Russia, located on the banks the Vorskla River (the left tributary of the Dnieper River). Population:

References

Rural localities in Grayvoronsky District
Grayvoronsky Uyezd